Mitsukurina is a genus of mackerel shark in the family Mitsukurinidae. It contains one extant species, the goblin shark (M. owstoni) and more extinct species. The genus was described by American ichthyologist David Starr Jordan in 1898 and named in honour of Kakichi Mitsukuri.

Species
 †Mitsukurina lineata (Probst, 1879)
 †Mitsukurina maslinensis (Pledge, 1967)
 Mitsukurina owstoni Jordan, 1898 (goblin shark)

References

 
Bartonian first appearances
Extant Eocene first appearances
Shark genera
Taxa named by David Starr Jordan
Fish genera with one living species